Huddersfield Town's 1914–15 campaign was the last league campaign before the Football League was suspended following the outbreak of World War I. Town finished in 8th place in Division 2, but it could have improved had Town not had a bad spell at the start of 1915, saw Town lose 6 out of 7 matches, which if Town had won all of them, they would have won promotion.

Squad at the start of the season

Review
Despite the outbreak of World War I, the Football League continued for the season to sustain the morale of the country. However, in early November, Larrett Roebuck was killed in action in France. Town's form was good enough at the start of the season to give them a chance at getting into Division 1. However, just after the turn of the year, Town's form dropped alarmingly and they lost their chance to get promoted and finished 8th with 42 points.

Squad at the end of the season

Results

Division Two

FA Cup

Appearances and goals

1914-15
English football clubs 1914–15 season